The men's 200 metres event at the 2000 Asian Athletics Championships was held in Jakarta, Indonesia on 29–31 August.

Medalists

Results

Heats
Wind:Heat 1: -0.3 m/s, Heat 2: -0.9 m/s, Heat 3: -2.0 m/s, Heat 4: -1.6 m/s

Semifinals
Wind:Heat 1: +1.9 m/s, Heat 2: +0.4 m/s

Final
Wind: +0.4 m/s

References

2000 Asian Athletics Championships
200 metres at the Asian Athletics Championships